Lesley Baker (born 20 January 1944) is an Australian actress, singer, dancer and comedian.  She was well known for her early appearances on In Melbourne Tonight with Graham Kennedy. After which she went on to play several roles for Crawford Productions series. 

She is best known for her roles as hulking husband basher Monica Ferguson in early episodes of Prisoner, she returned to that series playing a different character of "Tinker" Bell Peters She has played the itinerant role Angie Rebecchi since 1995 the mother of Toadie Rebecchi (Ryan Moloney) in Neighbours.

Filmography

References

External links

Interview on Neighbours the Perfect Blend

1944 births
Australian female dancers
Australian film actresses
Australian soap opera actresses
Living people
Actresses from Melbourne
20th-century Australian actresses
20th-century Australian dancers
21st-century Australian actresses
21st-century Australian dancers
20th-century Australian women singers
21st-century Australian women singers